The 1950 United States Senate election in Missouri took place on November 7, 1950 in Missouri. The incumbent Republican Senator, Forrest C. Donnell, was defeated by Democratic nominee Thomas C. Hennings Jr. Hennings won 53.6% of the vote. Two other candidates also ran.

Democratic primary

Candidates
 Emery Allison, former State Senator for the 24th district
 Thomas C. Hennings Jr., lawyer and former representative for Missouri's 11th district
 Marjorie Bell Hinrichs, cosmetics manufacturer
 James W. Hopkins, accountant
Ben M. Johnson, contractor

Results

Republican primary

Candidates
 Gordon R. Coates, building materials dealer
 Forrest C. Donnell, the incumbent Senator
 William McKinley Thomas, furniture warehouse employee

Results

Other candidates
The antisemitic organisation Christian Nationalist Crusade ran under the "Christian Nationalist" label, after being approved by the Secretary of State Walter H. Toberman. They nominated John W. Hamilton. The Socialist Labor Party of America nominated Henry W. Genck.

Results

References

1950
Missouri
United States Senate